UGC 6665 (Arp 161) is a spiral field galaxy in the constellation Virgo. It is an estimated 265 million light-years from the Milky Way, and is listed in Halton Arp's Atlas of Peculiar Galaxies as  number 161.

UGC 6665 is a blue compact dwarf (BCD) galaxy. Like some other BCDs, it has an unusually high ratio of nitrogen to oxygen.

References

Peculiar galaxies
006665
Virgo (constellation)
Spiral galaxies